Corridor train may refer to:
Privileged transit traffic
Corridor (Via Rail), Quebec City-Windsor Corridor, Canada
Amtrak trains of the Northeast Corridor, USA
Amtrak's Capitol Corridor service in Northern California, USA
A train with corridor connection